Rudy Maxa (born 1949) is an American consumer travel expert.

Maxa is the host and executive producer of 85 half-hour travel shows on the world's great destinations that are broadcast on public television in the U.S. with titles such as Smart Travels: Europe with Rudy Maxa, Smart Travels: Pacific Rim with Rudy Maxa, and—since 2008—Rudy Maxa's World.  

Maxa began his career in journalism after graduating from Ohio University as an investigative reporter, magazine writer, and personalities columnist at The Washington Post. 

His reporting on a Capitol Hill sex scandal and the resulting changes in congressional rules was nominated for the Pulitzer Prize, and he received the John Hancock Award for Excellence in Business and Financial Journalism for a series of stories on an international Ponzi scheme.

He left the Post to become a senior editor at the city magazine Washingtonian (1983–92) and also worked as the Washington bureau chief of Spy magazine (1992–94). He is a contributing editor with National Geographic Traveler magazine and Delta Air Lines' magazine, Sky.

He is the author of two nonfiction books, Dare To Be Great (1976) and Public Trust, Private Lust (1977). 

He has written articles for GQ, Forbes, USA Today, Modern Maturity, Playboy, Town & Country Travel, Travel & Leisure, and dozens of other newspapers and magazines. 

He wrote for the ABC-TV drama series Capital News and for several years hosted a Saturday-morning radio talk show on political issues for WRC-AM, Washington, D.C.

Maxa attributes his desire to travel partly to the fact he grew up as a military brat. Maxa lives in St. Paul, Minnesota. He has a son and a daughter.

References

External links
RudyMaxa.com official website
The Savvy Traveler
SmartTravels.tv
1974 Rudy Maxa Interview with Carroll Quigley

1949 births
American male non-fiction writers
American travel television series
American travel writers
American investigative journalists
American male journalists
Journalists from Washington, D.C.
Living people
Ohio University alumni
Place of birth missing (living people)
Travel broadcasters
People from Cleveland
Date of birth missing (living people)